The Truth About Cats & Dogs is a 1996 American romantic comedy film directed by Michael Lehmann and written by Audrey Wells. It stars Janeane Garofalo, Uma Thurman, Ben Chaplin and Jamie Foxx. The story is a modern reinterpretation of the 1897 Cyrano de Bergerac story and follows Abby, a veterinarian and radio talk show host who asks her model friend Noelle to impersonate her when a handsome guy shows interest in her. The original music score was composed by Howard Shore. Upon its release, the film garnered positive reviews and was met with considerable box office success.

Plot

Abby Barnes is a veterinarian and host of a radio show called The Truth About Cats and Dogs. Photographer Brian calls into her show for advice, and unexpectedly sends her a gift and calls her at work to ask her out; she agrees to meet. Her insecurity about her appearance leads her to lie to him over the phone and describe herself with the physical features of her neighbor Noelle. She stands him up. After intervening in an argument between Noelle and her abusive boyfriend Roy, the two women become friends. Brian shows up unexpectedly at Abby's work at the same time as Noelle, and Abby convinces her to pretend she is Abby.

Abby adopts the persona of Donna, friend to Noelle (posing as Abby) and the two begin spending time with Brian together. They invent a story that Abby uses a different voice on the radio than in real life. He is physically attracted to Noelle, but notices that "Abby" has a distinctly different (and decidedly less intellectual) personality in person than on the radio and phone. When he calls the real Abby to ask her out again, he asks her to use her "radio voice" and the two spend nearly seven hours on the phone getting to know one another.

The two women decide to tell Brian the truth by way of Noelle showing up at his home while Abby is live on the radio, but when Noelle arrives, she is entranced by the many kind things he says about her personality and intelligence (even though he is actually talking about Abby). She fails to tell him the truth, which nearly causes a rift between the women, but ultimately Noelle realizes that flattery about someone else may feel good in the moment but isn't authentic. She takes a two-week modeling gig out of town in order to put space between herself and Brian.

Noelle returns and tells Brian to make a list of the things he loves about Abby, and to meet at Abby's apartment that night. He does, and reads the list to "Donna". The first few things on the list are about Noelle's appearance, but then the list evolves into more important things about Abby that Brian has truly fallen in love with. He professes his love through the bathroom door thinking "Abby" is bathing inside, but gets no response. He then notices flyers for a charity event Abby is attending, complete with her photo, and realizes the truth.

Abby later approaches Brian at his bar, apologizing for her deceit and explains what really happened. Although initially dismissive, he eventually meets with Abby again and admits he has fallen for her and was only attracted to Noelle because of their deception. He suggests they start again, and Abby happily agrees.

Cast

Themes
Screenwriter Audrey Wells said she was inspired by the 1897 play Cyrano de Bergerac by Edmond Rostand and wanted to modernize it by flipping the genders of the original characters. In this version, Abby is the talented but "ugly" Cyrano, Noelle is Christian, and Brian is Roxane.

Commenting on the ugly-versus-beautiful theme, Uma Thurman said, "We probably keep going back to that idea because there's a whole industry that needs to sell a lot of products that wants us to think that the outside is the important part. There's a war going on. The inside's not as commercial as the outside. People are so affected by how they're received in the world, and some or all of our first experiences are based on how we're externally judged. The conflict between the inner and the outer is a constant battle everybody experiences on lots of levels."

In a retrospective essay for Den of Geek, Aliya Whiteley wrote one of the film's distinguishing factors from other variations of the Cyrano story is that it gives as much importance to the friendship between the two main female characters as it does to the romantic plot line.

Reception
The film received positive reviews from critics. It has an 85% "fresh" rating at Rotten Tomatoes from 47 reviews. The site's consensus states: "Sharp, witty, and charming, The Truth About Cats & Dogs features a standout performance from Janeane Garofalo."

Writing for The Baltimore Sun, Stephen Hunter said, "The movie, which takes as its subject the difficulty of cats and dogs living together, or at least getting together, is as good a romantic comedy as has come this way in a long time." The Hartford Courant said "Garofalo shows comic flair, deft timing, surprising depth."

Roger Ebert noted the film:  Of Garofalo, Ebert wrote in comparison to her roles in Bye Bye Love and Reality Bites:  Of Uma Thurman, Ebert wrote: 

Many reviewers criticized the idea that Garofalo's character was expected to be viewed as unattractive, finding it unrealistic due to the actress's natural beauty.

Although the film was a decent commercial success, in later years Garofalo expressed dissatisfaction with the film: 

Several years after the film's release, Garofalo became an actual radio talk show host when she co-hosted The Majority Report on Air America Radio from 2004 to 2006.

Box office
The film opened to $6.77 million in its opening weekend, nearly tying the Jean-Claude Van Damme film The Quest which took in $7.03 million. The film was in the number 2 spot in North American box offices for three consecutive weeks. It grossed about $34,073,143 in the United States by 11 August 1996 and went on to gross $34,861,807 overseas.

Soundtrack

The Truth About Cats & Dogs is the soundtrack from the 1996 film The Truth About Cats & Dogs, released by A&M Records in 1996.  The album features a variety of music such as rock, R&B, and pop.

References

External links
 
 
 
 
 "The 'Truth' About Stardom", a 1996 Entertainment Weekly article about Garofalo, Thurman, and the making of The Truth About Cats & Dogs.

1996 films
1996 romantic comedy films
American female buddy films
American romantic comedy films
20th Century Fox films
Films based on Cyrano de Bergerac (play)
Films directed by Michael Lehmann
Films scored by Howard Shore
Films set in Santa Monica, California
Films shot in Los Angeles County, California
Films with screenplays by Audrey Wells
1990s female buddy films
1990s feminist films
1990s English-language films
1990s American films
Films about radio people